Nosler produces six different hunting cartridges. The first to be introduced was .26 Nosler, followed by .28 Nosler, .30 Nosler, .33 Nosler, .22 Nosler, and .27 Nosler.

.22 Nosler

The .22 Nosler is a .22-caliber (.224 in; 5.6 mm), rebated-rim centerfire rifle cartridge designed by Nosler. The .22 Nosler is a SAAMI approved and standardized cartridge.

Background
In January 2017 Nosler introduced the .22 Nosler. It is the fifth cartridge designed by Nosler. It is claimed that the .22 Nosler delivers 25% more case capacity and is nearly  faster than a .223 Remington/ 5.56 NATO. The .22 Nosler is designed to use the existing bolt face of an AR-15, and conversions to this caliber can be accomplished with a simple barrel swap. The shoulder is set back slightly compared to the 5.56 cartridge to prevent accidentally chambering a 5.56 cartridge in a .22 Nosler rifle. The case diameter and taper resemble those of the 6.8mm Remington SPC; so Nosler recommends using a magazine designed for that cartridge. While similar to the 6.8 SPC in some regards, there is no parent case and the .22 Nosler cannot be formed from 6.8 SPC brass. The .224 Valkyrie is a similar cartridge, but the two are not interchangeable.

Barrel Life
Barrel life ranges from 2,000 to 4,000 rounds depending on use.

.26 Nosler

The .26 Nosler (6.5×66mmRB) is a rebated-rim centerfire rifle cartridge designed by Nosler and first announced in November 2013. It is the first cartridge designed by Nosler.

Background
The name .26 Nosler refers to the first two digits in the caliber (0.264 in; 6.7 mm) of the bullets that the cartridge fires and the name of the company which created it.

Four of Nosler's Cartridges, the .26 Nosler, .28 Nosler, .30 Nosler, and .33 Nosler, are based on the same .300 Remington Ultra Magnum parent case.  While the .26 Nosler and the .28 Nosler share the same cartridge case dimensions, the .30 Nosler has a slightly shorter length to the shoulder dimension than the .26 Nosler and the .28 Nosler, and the .33 Nosler has a shorter shoulder length dimension than that of the .30 Nosler.

Performance
When released, the .26 Nosler was claimed to be the most powerful commercial 6.5 mm cartridge in the world.

Barrel Life
The high velocity of the .26 Nosler cartridge has raised concerns about excessive barrel wear, potentially wearing down barrels at a rate faster than that of the similar .264 Winchester Magnum, which itself has a reputation for being a "barrel burner".

Specifications
The .26 Nosler cartridge specifications have been submitted to SAAMI and a data sheet is currently available.

.27 Nosler

Nosler adds a new cartridge in 2020, the .27 Nosler. Nosler plans to use a 1:8.5" (216 mm) twist barrel for their M48 rifles chambered in .27 Nosler. Nosler will be offering their complete line of M48 rifles in the .27 Nosler chambering. Initial factory loads will include the  AccuBond and the  AccuBond Long Range (ABLR) bullets. For handloaders, Nosler will also offer fully prepared Nosler brass, bullets and reloading data for the .27 Nosler. RCBS reloading dies are also currently available for the cartridge. When firing a  AccuBond Long Range bullet from a rifle with a  barrel, the .27 Nosler has an approximately  advantage over the .270 Winchester, about a  advantage over the .270 WSM, and about a  velocity advantage over the .270 Weatherby. The primary use for the .27 Nosler is hunting.

.28 Nosler

The .28 Nosler is a 7 mm (.284") caliber, rebated-rim centerfire rifle cartridge designed by Nosler. Introduced in 2015  and approved by SAAMI on January 19, 2015. It is the second cartridge designed by Nosler

Background
The name .28 Nosler refers to the first two digits in the caliber (0.284 in; 7.2 mm) of the bullets that the cartridge fires and the name of the company which created it.

The .28 Nosler is based on the .26 Nosler which was released in 2014. This feature helps weight-conscious sportsmen to lighten their load before venturing into the backcountry. The cases’ overall length also aids in quick follow-up shots, since the bolt throw is shorter than on a magnum action.

Four of Nosler's Cartridges the .26 Nosler, .28 Nosler, .30 Nosler, and the .33 Nosler are based on the same .300 Remington Ultra Magnum parent case.  While the .26 Nosler and the .28 Nosler share the same cartridge case dimensions, the .30 Nosler has a slightly shorter length to the shoulder dimension than the .26 Nosler and the .28 Nosler, and the .33 Nosler has a shorter shoulder dimension yet than that of the .30 Nosler.

Design Considerations
The .28 Nosler is essentially a shortened version of the 7mm Remington Ultra Magnum (7mm RUM). Rebating the rim to  simplifies the production of rifle bolts since the rims of Holland & Holland-style belted magnums, such as the 7mm Remington Magnum and .300 Winchester Magnum, are the same diameter. The dimension at that point on the .28 Nosler case is  larger, and that reduces its body taper by just a tad. Shoulder angles are 30 degrees for the Remington cartridge and a slightly sharper 35 degrees for the Nosler. Due to its greater length, the Remington case is about 25 percent more capacious than the Nosler.

Barrel Life
Since the .28 Nosler burns smaller powder charges than the 7mm RUM, barrel accuracy life is potentially a bit longer. How much longer depends on a number of things, including barrel quality and whether a barrel is regularly cleaned and serviced or abused by its owner.

Reloading
The .28 Nosler cartridge case can be formed by "necking up" or expanding the neck of a .26 Nosler case to 7 mm (.284") diameter.

.30 Nosler

The .30 Nosler is a 30-caliber (.308 in; 7.62 mm), rebated-rim centerfire rifle cartridge designed by Nosler. Introduced in 2016, the .30 Nosler is a SAAMI approved and standardized cartridge. It is the third cartridge designed by Nosler

Background
The name .30 Nosler refers to the first two digits in the caliber (0.308 in; 7.62 mm) of the bullets that the cartridge fires and the name of the company which created it.

This is Nosler's third cartridge following its predecessors the .26 Nosler which was released in 2014 and the .28 Nosler which was released in 2015.  The .30 Nosler shares the same overall cartridge length  as the .26 Nosler and the .28 Nosler which allows it to be chambered in standard-length action firearms.

Four of Nosler's Cartridges, the .26 Nosler, .28 Nosler, .30 Nosler, and .33 Nosler, are based on the same .300 Remington Ultra Magnum parent case.  While the .26 Nosler and the .28 Nosler share the same cartridge case dimensions, the .30 Nosler has a slightly shorter length to the shoulder dimension than the .26 Nosler and the .28 Nosler, and the .33 Nosler has a shorter shoulder dimension yet than that of the .30 Nosler.

The .30 Nosler was released in January 2016. Later in October 2016, Nosler continued to add to the cartridge family by releasing the .33 Nosler, and in January 2017 they introduced the .22 Nosler.

Performance
According to a recent Nosler publication, the .30 Nosler surpasses the velocity of the .300 Weatherby Magnum, headspaces off of the shoulder like a .300 Remington Ultra Magnum and fits the same standard length action of a 300 Winchester Magnum.

.33 Nosler

The .33 Nosler is a .33-caliber (.338 in; 8.6 mm), rebated-rim centerfire rifle cartridge designed by Nosler. Introduced in 2016 (production release 2017), the .33 Nosler is a SAAMI approved and standardized cartridge. It is the fourth cartridge designed by Nosler.

Background
The name .33 Nosler refers to the first two digits in the caliber (0.338 in; 8.6 mm) of the bullets that the cartridge fires and the name of the company which created it.

The .33 Nosler is Nosler's fourth cartridge following its predecessors the .26 Nosler which was released in 2014, the .28 Nosler which was released in 2015, and the .30 Nosler which was released in 2016.  The .33 Nosler shares the same overall cartridge length  as the .26 Nosler, the .28 Nosler, and the .30 Nosler, which allows it to be chambered in standard-length action firearms.

Four of Nosler's Cartridges, .26 Nosler, .28 Nosler, .30 Nosler and .33 Nosler, are based on the same .300 Remington Ultra Magnum parent case.  While the .26 Nosler and .28 Nosler share the same cartridge case dimensions, the .30 Nosler has a slightly shorter length to the shoulder dimension than the .26 Nosler and .28 Nosler, and the .33 Nosler has a shorter shoulder dimension yet than that of the .30 Nosler.

Performance
According to a recent Nosler publication the .33 Nosler surpasses the velocity of the .338 Lapua Magnum by 25fps while burning 18% less powder. The .33 Nosler is built on the same action length as the .338 Winchester Magnum but launches projectiles at a higher velocity.

Availability
The .33 Nosler was released in 2017 with Nosler supplying ammunition and components.
Nosler is also offering rifles chambered in the .33 Nosler in its Liberty and Heritage lines, with the first rifle being the M48 Western.

See also
.338 Winchester Magnum
.338 Lapua Magnum
6.5-300 Weatherby Magnum
6.5 Creedmoor
6.5x55 Swedish

References

Pistol and rifle cartridges
Nosler